Borsh Castle also known as Sopot Castle from the hill it is located, is a ruined castle near the village Borsh, Albania, near the coast of the Ionian Sea. Inside the castle is the 17th-century Hajji Bendo Mosque from Ottoman times.

History 
The castle dates to Antiquity, and its fortifications follow the trace of an acropolis, with four subsequent phases of reconstruction, ranging from the early Byzantine period to the late Middle Ages. The name "Sopot" is of Slavic origin. In medieval Greek documents, the castle is named Sopoton or Sopotos, from which its name in other languages derives; its harbour is mentioned in Greek portolans with the name Gazopolis. 

The site is first mentioned in the early 13th century, when archbishop Demetrios Chomatenos wrote of the "archonship of Sopotos" (archontia Sopotou), part of the region of Vagenetia. In 1258, the Despot of Epirus Michael II Komnenos Doukas gave the castle along with Buthrotum and the island of Corfu as dowry for his daughter Helena to Manfred, King of Sicily. It came back under Epirote control soon thereafter, before being once again ceded by Nikephoros I Komnenos Doukas to Charles I of Anjou in 1279. The area returned again to Epirote hands in the subsequent decades, but in the Epirote rebellion against Palaiologan Byzantine rule in 1338–39, it remained loyal to Emperor Andronikos III Palaiologos. 

Following the Ottoman conquest, a cadaster from 1431 lists Sopot with 60 households, and as capital of a nahiye. In 1456, troops of King Alfonso V of Aragon were operating in the area of Sobato against the Ottomans. In 1470 it was under Venetian control, under the jurisdiction of the governor of Corfu; at the end of the Ottoman–Venetian War of 1463–1479, the Ottomans laid claim to it and apparently received it. In 1481 Albanians led by Gjon Kastrioti II invaded Southern Albania from Italy and captured the castle, but retreated in 1484. In 1488 the local Albanian population rebelled against Ottoman rule. 

The walls of the castle, which follow the ancient fortifications, survive. In the interior, the medieval fortress was divided through a wall in two. Triangular towers were added later, probably during the middle Byzantine period. In the interior of the castle stand ruins of various buildings and cisterns.

References

Sources

Ruined castles in Albania
Buildings and structures in Himara
Byzantine forts